Hilderbrand is an unincorporated community in Cape Girardeau County, in the U.S. state of Missouri.

History
A post office called Hilderbrand was established in 1905, and remained in operation until 1954. The community has the name of Dan Hilderbrand, owner of the site.

References

Unincorporated communities in Cape Girardeau County, Missouri
Unincorporated communities in Missouri